Hugo Väli (19 June 1902 – 1943) was an Estonian footballer. He competed in the men's tournament at the 1924 Summer Olympics. He died in a Soviet prison camp during World War II.

References

External links
 

1902 births
1943 deaths
Estonian footballers
Estonia international footballers
Olympic footballers of Estonia
Footballers at the 1924 Summer Olympics
Footballers from Tallinn
Association football forwards
Estonian people who died in Soviet detention
People who died in the Gulag